Cisternes-la-Forêt is a commune in the Puy-de-Dôme department in Auvergne-Rhône-Alpes in central France. The population as of 2019 was 463.

See also
 Communes of the Puy-de-Dôme department

References

Cisterneslaforet